Step Up (Original Soundtrack) is the film soundtrack for the film Step Up. It was released on August 8, 2006, on Jive Records and features new music from Mario, Drew Sidora, Ciara, Chamillionaire, Kelis, Chris Brown, Jamie Scott, Yung Joc and 3LW. The lead singles from the soundtrack are Sean Paul's "(When You Gonna) Give It Up to Me" featuring Keyshia Cole and Ciara's "Get Up" featuring Chamillionaire. Other tracks include Kelis' "80's Joint", Anthony Hamilton's "Dear Life", Youngbloodz's "I'mma Shine", and Petey Pablo's "Show Me the Money"and Dolla's"Feelin 'Myself". The title track is performed by newcomer Samantha Jade and produced by Wyclef Jean. The soundtrack was certified gold by the Recording Industry Association of America on May 3, 2007.

Track listing

Charts

Weekly charts

Year-end charts

Certifications

Step Up (Samantha Jade song)

"Step Up" is the debut single by Australian recording artist Samantha Jade, released on 3 November 2006 through Jive Records. It is the title track from the soundtrack album of the film, Step Up. The song was written by Diane Warren and was produced by Wyclef Jean.

Music video
The accompanying music video for "Step Up" premiered on YouTube on 10 August 2006. The video features scenes of Jade singing and dancing, and intercut scenes from the film.

Charts
In the United States, "Step Up" peaked at number 92 on the Billboard Pop 100 chart in 2006. In Australia, the song failed to enter the ARIA Singles Chart, but debuted and peaked at number 50 on the ARIA Digital Singles Chart dated 12 February 2007. The track didn't chart in Australia due to digital sales not being added into the main chart until later in the year.

References

Step Up (film series) albums
2006 soundtrack albums
Albums produced by Bryan-Michael Cox
Albums produced by Jazze Pha
Albums produced by the Neptunes
Albums produced by Raphael Saadiq
Albums produced by Ryan Tedder
Albums produced by Tony Bongiovi
Albums produced by Wyclef Jean
Dance music soundtracks
Hip hop soundtracks
Jive Records soundtracks
Rhythm and blues soundtracks
Romance film soundtracks